Bishop Moore Catholic High School is a private Roman Catholic high school in the College Park neighborhood of Orlando, Florida. The school is located within the Diocese of Orlando, and remains the only Catholic high school in Greater Orlando.  The enrollment capacity is approximately 1,500 students.

Description 
The school was built in 1954, and was named after Bishop John Moore; he was the second bishop of the Diocese of St. Augustine, which had been the only diocese in Florida prior to the creation of the Archdiocese of Miami (1958).

John Moore was born in County Westmeath, Ireland, and moved to Charleston, South Carolina at the age of 14. He served as Bishop of St. Augustine from 1877 to 1901. Moore was influential in the expansion of Catholic schools in Florida and in the recruitment of religious nuns and priests to meet the ministerial needs of the diocese.

The school sits on a  campus adjacent to Little Lake Fairview.  There are multiple campus buildings.  An extensive renovation and expansion occurred seven years ago  with the addition of a new gymnasium complex, administrative building, library complex, band room, and class room space. Loretta Hall and the Massaro Science Wing were restored.  The landmark "Golden Dome" remains in use as a secondary gymnasium, and was recently renovated to include extra classrooms and a space for theater productions. Most of the buildings are original to the campus, with new additions being to the science labs in summer 2011. In the summer of 2016, the media center and Mary Martha Hall were renovated to add a new student cafe and additional classrooms. In May 2021, the new Moore Center for Excellence, a multi-purpose athletic and academic facility, was dedicated and opened.

Notable alumni
 Jennifer Arnold,  featured on The Little Couple
 Jenn Brown, ESPN sportscaster
 Drew Butera, Retired MLB player (Twins, Dodgers, Angels, Royals, Rockies), Current MLB coach (Angels)
 Manny Coto, TV and film writer and producer
 Mike Fall, former professional soccer player
 Mel Martinez, former U.S. Senator
 Michael McClendon, former MLB player (Milwaukee Brewers)
 Mandy Moore, singer and actress
 Tim Geltz, former professional soccer player
 Emily Piriz, featured on American Idol
 Tony Renna, former IndyCar driver
Bob Spitulski, former NFL player
Diego Elias

References

External links

High schools in Orange County, Florida
Catholic secondary schools in Florida
Schools in Orlando, Florida
Educational institutions established in 1954
1954 establishments in Florida